Pavel Kaskarov (June 5, 1947, Moscow, RSFSR, Soviet Union born) — was a Soviet and Russian physicist. Doctor of physical and mathematical Sciences, honored Professor of Moscow state University. Head of the Department of General physics for the faculty of chemistry/General physics and molecular electronics

Research interests: physics of surface phenomena in semiconductors. H-Index - 23.

Biography 
P. Kashkarov was born on June 5, 1947 in Moscow.

In 1971 he graduated from the physics Department of Moscow State University. In 1975 he defended his thesis for the degree of candidate of physical and mathematical Sciences.

In 1980-1981, he completed an internship at the Massachusetts Institute of Technology (Cambridge , Massachusetts, USA).

In 1990, he defended his thesis for the degree of doctor of physical and mathematical Sciences.

Prepared 20 candidates of science.

Publications 
He has published 329 scientific papers in domestic and foreign journals.

Awards 
 Order of Alexander Nevsky
 Medal of the Order "For Merit to the Fatherland", 2 degrees

References

Links 
 
 ФНБИК 2015
 
 Павел Константинович Кашкаров (К 60-летию со дня рождения), Кристаллография, 2007, том 52, № 4, с. 782-783

1947 births
20th-century Russian physicists
Soviet physicists
Moscow State University
Living people